CSS Shenandoah, formerly Sea King and later El Majidi, was an iron-framed, teak-planked, full-rigged sailing ship with auxiliary steam power chiefly known for her actions under Lieutenant Commander James Waddell as part of the Confederate States Navy during the American Civil War.

Shenandoah was originally a British merchant ship launched as Sea King on August 17, 1863, but was later repurposed as one of the most feared commerce raiders in the Confederate Navy. For twelve-and-a-half months from 1864 to 1865, the ship undertook commerce raiding around the world in an effort to disrupt the Union's economy, which resulted in the capture and the sinking or bonding of 38 merchant vessels, mostly whaling ships from New Bedford, Massachusetts. She finally surrendered on the River Mersey, Liverpool, United Kingdom, on November 6, 1865, six months after the war had ended. Her flag was the last sovereign Confederate flag to be officially furled.

Shenandoah is also known for having fired the last shot of the Civil War, across the bow of a whaler in waters off the Aleutian Islands.

History and mission

The ship had three names and many owners in her lifetime of nine years. She was designed as an auxiliary composite passenger cargo ship of 1,018 tons and built in 1863 by Alexander Stephen & Sons, Glasgow, Scotland, for Robertson & Co., Glasgow, to be named Sea King. The ship was intended for the East Asia tea trade and as a troop transport. While she was being fitted out at the builders, US representatives assessed the ship for purchase. After change of owner and a number of trips to the Far East carrying cargo and to New Zealand transporting troops to the New Zealand Wars, the Confederate navy assessed and purchased her from Wallace Bros of Liverpool. The purchase was made in secret; it was completed on 18 October 1864, and the next day the ship was renamed CSS Shenandoah. The ship was to be converted into an armed cruiser with a mission to capture and destroy Union merchant ships. Liverpool was the unofficial home port of the Confederate overseas fleet, and Confederate Commander James Dunwoody Bulloch was based in the city. The city provided ships, crews, munitions, and provisions of war.

Sea King had sailed from London on 8 October 1864, ostensibly for Bombay, on a trading voyage. The supply steamer Laurel sailed from Liverpool the same day. The two ships rendezvoused at Funchal, Madeira, with Laurel carrying the officers and the nucleus of Shenandoahs crew, together with naval guns, ammunition, and ship's stores. Shenandoahs commander, Lieutenant James Iredell Waddell, supervised her conversion to a man-of-war in nearby waters. However, Waddell was barely able to bring his crew to even half strength, despite additional volunteers from the merchant sailors on Sea King and from Laurel.

The new Confederate cruiser was commissioned on 19 October 1864, lowering the Union Jack and raising the "Stainless Banner", and was renamed CSS Shenandoah.

As developed in the Confederate Navy Department and by its agents in Europe, Shenandoah was tasked to strike at the Union's economy and "seek out and utterly destroy" commerce in areas yet undisturbed. Captain Waddell began seeking enemy merchant ships on the Indian Ocean route between the Cape of Good Hope and Australia, and in the Pacific whaling fleet. En route to the Cape, the Confederates captured six prizes. Five were burned or scuttled, after the crew and passengers had been removed. The sixth was bonded and used to transport the prisoners to Bahia, Brazil, where they were released. On the 2nd of January 1865, the Shenandoah briefly stopped at Île Saint-Paul, and some of the crew debarked to explore the island and gather food.

Colony of Victoria stopover

Still short-handed, Shenandoah arrived at Melbourne, Colony of Victoria, on January 25, 1865, where she filled her complement and her storerooms. She also signed on 40 crew members who had been stowaways from Melbourne. They were not enlisted until the ship was outside the Colony of Victoria's territorial waters. The Shipping Articles show all 40 crew members had enlisted on the day of her departure from Melbourne, February 18, 1865. However, 19 of Waddell's crew deserted at Melbourne, some giving statements of their service to the United States Consul.

Pacific raids

Shenandoah took only one prize in the Indian Ocean, but hunting became more profitable after refitting in Melbourne. En route to the North Pacific whaling grounds, on April 3–4, Waddell burned four whalers in the Caroline Islands. After a three-week cruise to the ice and fog of the Sea of Okhotsk yielded only a single prize, due to a warning which had preceded him, Waddell headed north past the Aleutian Islands into the Bering Sea and the Arctic Ocean. Shenandoah then proceeded to capture 11 more prizes.

The rich whaling grounds in the Bering Sea between Siberia and Alaska had been a safe haven for Yankee whalers for most of the American Civil War. This prosperous whaling ended in the spring and summer of 1865 when Shenandoah arrived and captured 20 of the 58 Yankee whalers working here. These whalers were destroyed more than a month after CSA President Jefferson Davis was captured on May 10, 1865.

On June 27, 1865, Waddell learned from a prize, Susan & Abigail, that General Robert E. Lee had surrendered the Army of Northern Virginia almost three months earlier at Appomattox Court House. Susan & Abigail'''s captain produced a San Francisco newspaper reporting the flight from Richmond of the Confederate government 10 weeks previously. However, the newspaper also contained President Davis' proclamation that the "war would be carried on with re-newed vigor." Waddell then captured 10 more whalers in the space of seven hours just below the Arctic Circle.

On August 3, 1865, Waddell learned of the war's definite end when Shenandoah encountered the Liverpool barque Barracouta, which was bound for San Francisco. Waddell was heading to the city to attack it, believing it weakly defended. He learned of the surrender of Johnston's army on April 26, and Kirby Smith's army on May 26, and most crucially of the capture of President Davis. Captain Waddell then knew the war was over.

Captain Waddell lowered the Confederate flag, and Shenandoah underwent physical alteration. Her guns were dismounted and stowed below deck, and her hull was painted to look like an ordinary merchant ship.

Names and dates of 38 vessels captured by CSS Shenandoah, 1864–1865:

 1. October 30, 1864: the cargo bark Alina is scuttled south of the Azores, west of Dakar, near .
 2.
 3. November 8: the cargo bark D. Godfrey of Boston is sunk southwest of the Cape Verde Islands, near .
 4. November 10: the cargo hermaphrodite brig Susan of Boston is scuttled southwest of the Cape Verde Islands.
 5, 6. The bark Adelaide is ransomed for $24,000 and released.
 7. November 13: the cargo schooner Lizzie M. Stacey of Boston is scuttled and burned near the Equator.
 8. December 4: the whaling bark Edward is burned off Tristan da Cunha, near .
 9.
 From January 26 to February 17, 1865, repairs, crew recruiting and resupply was done at Hobson's Bay, Australia.
 10. April 3: the whaling bark Pearl of New London is burned at Lohd Pah Harbor , Pohnpei Island in Micronesia.
 11, 12. April 4: the whaling ships Hector of New Bedford and Edward Carey of San Francisco are burned at Lohd Pah Harbor.
 13. April 10: the whaling bark Harvest, nominally of Honolulu, is also burned at Lohd Pah Harbor; at 7:30 AM, Shenandoah departs Lohd Pah Harbor for the Bering Sea.
 14.
 15–20.
 21.
 22–27.
 28–38. June 28: on this last and busiest day of captures, the whaler  is burned near Bering Strait Narrows; the whaling bark Congress of New Bedford is burned near Bering Strait; the whaling bark Covington of Warren, Rhode Island is burned in East Cape Bay near Bering Strait Narrows; the whaling ships Favorite of New Haven and Hillman, Isaac Howland, Martha and Nassau of New Bedford are burned in East Cape Bay; the whaling bark Waverly of New Bedford is burned near the Diomede Islands; the whaling ship James Maury of New Bedford is bonded for $37,600 in East Cape Bay and retained for transporting prisoners to the United States; and finally, the whaling bark Nile of New Bedford is bonded for $41,000, loaded with 222 prisoners, and sent off to San Francisco.

Surrender

Regardless of Davis's proclamation and knowing the unreliability of newspapers at the time, Captain Waddell and his crew knew returning to a U.S. port would mean facing a court sympathetic to the Union. News of Lincoln's assassination also served to further diminish any expectation for leniency. The crew predicted that surrendering to federal authorities would run the risk of being tried in a U.S. court and hanged as pirates. Commerce raiders were not included in the reconciliation and the amnesty that Confederate soldiers were given. Perhaps more importantly, Waddell would have been aware that the U.S. government no longer had to consider the threat of Confederate retaliation against Union prisoners while it determined his crew's fate. Likely not known to Waddell was that Captain Raphael Semmes of  had managed to escape charges of piracy by surrendering on May 1, 1865, as an army general under Joseph E. Johnston. Semmes's former sailors surrendered as artillerymen.

Captain Waddell eventually decided to surrender his ship at the port of Liverpool, where Confederate Commander Bulloch was stationed.

Last lowering of Confederate flag
She anchored at the Mersey Bar at the mouth of the estuary awaiting a pilot to board her to guide the ship up the river and into the enclosed docks. Not flying any flag, the pilot refused to take the ship into Liverpool; the crew raised the Confederate flag. CSS Shenandoah sailed up the River Mersey with the flag fully flying to crowds on the riverbanks.

The Liverpool Mercury reported the event on Tuesday, 7 November 1865:

 happened to be anchored in mid-river between Toxteth in Liverpool and Tranmere in Birkenhead. Captain Waddell maneuvered his ship near to the British man-of-war, dropping anchor. The CSS Shenandoah was surrendered by Captain Waddell to Captain Paynter of HMS Donegal on 6 November 1865. The Confederate flag was lowered again for the very last time, under the watch of a Royal Navy detachment and the crew.

CSS Shenandoah had struck her colors twice. This marked the last surrender of the American Civil War and the last official lowering of the Confederate flag. The very last act of the Civil War was Captain Waddell walking up the steps of Liverpool Town Hall with a letter to present to the mayor surrendering his ship to the UK government. In so doing, Shenandoah became the only Confederate warship to circumnavigate the globe.

The United States Naval War Records published in 1894:

After the surrender, the CSS Shenandoah was berthed in the partially constructed Herculaneum Dock awaiting her fate. Once the international legalities were settled, she was turned over to the United States government.

Fate of the crew
After the surrender of Shenandoah to the British government, a decision had to be made of what to do with the Confederate crew, knowing the consequences of piracy charges. Clearly many of the crew originated from the United Kingdom and its colonies and three had swum ashore in the cold November waters fearing the worst.

After a full investigation by law officers of the Crown, it was decided that the officers and crew did not infringe the rules of war or the laws of nations to justify being held as prisoners, so they were unconditionally released.

Lieutenant Commander James I. Waddell of North Carolina

First Lieutenant and Executive Officer, W.C. Whittle* of Virginia
Lieutenant John Grimball of South Carolina
Lieutenant Sidney Smith Lee* Jr. of Virginia
Lieutenant Francis Thornton Chew of Missouri
Lieutenant Dabney Minor Scales of Mississippi
Sailing Master Irvine S. Bulloch of Georgia
Passed Midshipman Orris Applewaith Browne* of Virginia
Passed Midshipman John Thompson Mason* of Virginia
Surgeon Charles E. Lining of South Carolina
Assistant Surgeon F.J. McNulty of District of Columbia
Paymaster William Breedlove Smith of Louisiana
Chief Engineer M. O'Brien of Louisiana
Assistant Engineer Codd of Maryland
 Assistant Marine Engineer John Hutchison of Scotland
Master's mate John Minor of Virginia
Master's Mate Lodge Colton of Maryland
Master's Mate Cornelius E. Hunt of Virginia
Boatswain George Harwood of England
Gunner Guy of England
Carpenter O'Shea of Ireland
Sailmaker Henry Alcott of England

Sometime in December 1865, crew members S.S. Lee, Orris M. Brown, John T. Mason and W.C. Whittle sailed from Liverpool to Buenos Aires, via Bahia, Rio de Janeiro and Montevideo. After prospecting for a while, they went to Rosario, upon Paraná River, and near there bought a small place and began farming. As the animosity of the US government began to soften towards them, Brown and Mason returned home; Lee and Whittle did the same later.

On returning home, Mason took a law course at the University of Virginia, graduated, and was successful at his profession. He settled in Baltimore, and married Miss Helen Jackson, of New York, daughter of the late Lieutenant Alonzo Jackson of the U.S. Navy.

Whittle returned home to Virginia from Buenos Aires in 1867. Born in Norfolk, Virginia in 1840, an 1858 graduate of the U.S. Naval Academy and an officer in the U.S. Navy before resigning his commission to accept a commission in the Confederate States Navy, Whittle was appointed captain of one of the Bay line steamers running between Baltimore, Norfolk and Portsmouth in 1868 shortly after returning to Virginia and continued in this capacity until 1890. After, he was a Superintendent for the Norfolk and Western Railway Company. In 1902, he became an organizer of the Virginia Bank and Trust Company, Virginia Bank and Trust Building, and served as its vice president and one of its directors thereafter.

Born in 1824, Captain Waddell was a former U.S. Navy officer with decades of sailing experience and a Mexican–American War naval combat veteran before resigning his commission to accept a commission in the Confederate States Navy. He returned from England to the United States in 1875 to captain San Francisco for the Pacific Mail Company. He later took command of a force that policed the oyster fleets in the Chesapeake Bay. In 1886, Waddell died of a brain disorder and was buried at St. Anne's Episcopal Church in Annapolis, Maryland.

Dr. Frederick J. McNulty, the ship's assistant surgeon, eventually became a resident of Boston, Massachusetts, where he was first employed as Superintendent of the City Lunatic Asylum at Austin Farm and, later, opened there a private sanitarium called Pine Grove Retreat at Roslindale while continuing to reside at 706 Huntington Avenue, Boston. He became a primary historical source for chroniclers of the actions of Shenandoah. Whittle recounts that McNulty, a man of irascible temper, laid the ship's barber out with a single blow when the barber shoved shaving soap in his mouth as part of the crew's hazing of the ship's officers in celebration of crossing the equator. McNulty enlisted as a surgical officer in the Chilean Navy immediately after the surrender of Shenandoah and later in 1869 accepted a commission in the Cuban Patriot Army, but was repeatedly prevented from traveling to join the Army by U.S. government authorities before settling in Boston in 1879. McNulty is variously reported to have been a native of Ireland, the District of Columbia and Richmond, Virginia, but was most likely a native of Ireland. He graduated from the Georgetown University School of Medicine in the District of Columbia and lived in Richmond, Virginia before resigning his commission in the medical service of the U.S. Navy to accept a commission in the Confederate States Navy. McNulty died at his home in Boston on June 14, 1897, at the age of 62.William C. Whittle "The Cruise of the Shenandoah", published in series on March 13 and April 3, 1907 in Confederate Column of the Portsmouth Star. Southern Historical Society Papers. (1907) (R.A. Brock, Ed.). Richmond, Virginia: Southern Historical Society, Vol. 35, p. 243, 247 (Google digitized Dec. 17, 2007).Eleventh Annual Report of the State Board of Lunacy and Charity of Massachusetts. 1890. Public Doc. No. 17. Boston, Massachusetts: Wright & Potter, p. 43 (Google digitized Dec. 2, 2008)

Fate
After her crew surrendered her to the British government at Liverpool on 6 November 1865, the British handed Shenandoah over to the United States government. The ship was sold to Matthew Isaac Wilson of Liverpool.

In 1867 Wilson sold her to Majid bin Said, the first Sultan of Zanzibar, who renamed her El Majidi after himself. On 15 April 1872 a hurricane hit Zanzibar. El Majidi was one of six ships owned by Seyed Burgash that were blown ashore and wrecked. Her crew were rescued. After temporary repairs she sailed on 10 September 1872 from Zanzibar to Bombay with 130 passengers and crew. She developed holes and took on water, sinking a few days later. El Majidi was subsequently repaired. She foundered in the Gulf of Aden off Socotra, Aden Governorate in November 1879. There were a few survivors. She was on a voyage from Zanzibar to Bombay, India, where she was to undergo repairs.

LegacyShenandoah had remained at sea for 12 months and 17 days, traversed 58,000 miles (carrying the Confederate flag around the globe for the only time) and sank or captured 38 ships, mostly whalers, all of them American civilian merchant vessels. Waddell took close to one thousand prisoners without a single war casualty among his crew; two men died of disease. The ship was never involved in conflict against any Union Naval vessel. The Confederate cruiser claimed more than 20 prizes valued at nearly $1,400,000. In an important development in international law, the U.S. government pursued claims (collectively called the Alabama Claims) against the British government and, following a court of arbitration, won heavy damages.

Battle ensign

The battle ensign of CSS Shenandoah is unique amongst the flags of the Confederate States of America as it was the only Confederate flag to circumnavigate the Earth during the Confederacy, and it was the last Confederate flag to be lowered by a combatant unit in the Civil War (in mid-river on the River Mersey at Liverpool, UK, on November 6, 1865).Shenandoahs battle ensign has been in the Museum of the Confederacy's collection since 1907 and is currently on display. Lieutenant Dabney [Minor] Scales CSN, gave the flag to a cousin, Eliza Hull Maury, for safekeeping. Eliza Hull Maury was a daughter of, and Richard Launcelot Maury was the eldest son of, Commodore Matthew Fontaine Maury. Colonel Richard Launcelot Maury CSA, Eliza's brother, brought the flag from England in 1873, and donated it to the museum in 1907. The flag itself measures .source: Robert F. Hancock, Director of Collections & Senior Curator, The Museum of the Confederacy

From the Southern Historical Society Papers:

See also
 Lost Empire (Cussler novel)

References

Bibliography
 Baldwin, John, Last Flag Down: The Epic Journey of the Last Confederate Warship, Crown Publishers, 2007, Random House, Incorporated, 2007, 
 Chaffin, Tom, Sea of Gray: The Around-the-World Odyssey of the Confederate Raider Shenandoah, Hill and Wang/Farrar, Straus and Giroux, 2006. 
 Schooler, Lynn, The Last Shot: The Incredible Story of the CSS Shenandoah and the True Conclusion of the Civil War, HarperCollins, 2005. 
 Silkenat, David. Raising the White Flag: How Surrender Defined the American Civil War. Chapel Hill: University of North Carolina Press, 2019. .
 United States Government Printing Office, Official Records of the Union and Confederate Navies in the War of the Rebellion'', United States Naval War Records Office, United States Office of Naval Records and Library, 1894

External links
 
  Official records of the Union and Confederate navies in the war of the rebellion By United States. Navy Dept, Washington : U.S. G.P.O., 1894–1922.
 Marauders of the Sea, Confederate Merchant Raiders During the American Civil War CSS Shenandoah. 1864–1865. Captain James I. Waddell
 Correspondence Respecting the Shenandoah Presented to both houses of Parliament, London, 1866 pp. 67–181
 Edwin H. Abbott Papers, W.S. Hoole Special Collections Library, University of Alabama

1863 ships
1863 establishments in Scotland
Auxiliary steamers
Commerce raiders
Cruisers of the Confederate States Navy
Maritime incidents in April 1872
Merchant ships of the United Kingdom
Naval ships of Zanzibar
Raids of the American Civil War
Ships built in Glasgow
Maritime incidents in November 1879